Ayer Hitam Forest Reserve is a 1248 hectares forest reserve managed by Universiti Putra Malaysia located in Puchong, Petaling District, Selangor, Malaysia. The forest has actually been leased for 80 years to this university by the Selangor government.

See also
 Geography of Malaysia

References 

Nature sites of Selangor
Forest reserves of Malaysia
Geography of Selangor
Petaling District